Incapillo is a Pleistocene caldera (a depression formed by the collapse of a volcano) in the La Rioja province of Argentina. It is considered the southernmost volcanic centre in the Central Volcanic Zone of the Andes with Pleistocene activity. Incapillo is one of several ignimbritic or calderic systems that, along with 44 active stratovolcanoes, are part of the Central Volcanic Zone.

Subduction of the Nazca Plate beneath the South America plate is responsible for most of the volcanism in the Central Volcanic Zone. After activity in the western Maricunga Belt volcanic arc ceased six million years ago, volcanism started up in the Incapillo region, forming the high volcanoes Monte Pissis, Cerro Bonete Chico and Sierra de Veladero. Later, a number of lava domes were emplaced between these volcanoes.

Incapillo is the source of the Incapillo ignimbrite, a medium-sized deposit comparable to the Katmai ignimbrite. A caldera with dimensions of  formed during the eruption. Later volcanism generated more lava domes within the caldera and a debris flow in the Sierra de Veladero. The lake within the caldera may overlie an area of ongoing hydrothermal activity.

Geography and structure 

Incapillo is located in Argentina's La Rioja province. The name "Incapillo" means "Crown of the Inca" in Quechua and is the highest caldera stemming from explosive volcanism in the world. It is also known as Bonete caldera, Corona del Inca or Inca Pillo. The crater is marketed as a zone of touristic interest.

Incapillo is part of the Andean Central Volcanic Zone, which extends through the countries of Chile, Bolivia, and Argentina and includes six or more Quaternary caldera or ignimbrite systems, about 44 stratovolcanoes, and over 18 smaller centres. One of these stratovolcanoes, Ojos del Salado, is the world's highest volcano. This zone also includes the Altiplano-Puna volcanic complex and the Galan caldera south of it. Incapillo is the southernmost volcano of the Central Volcanic Zone with Pleistocene activity; the next volcano to the south to have erupted during the Pleistocene is Tupungato, in the Southern Volcanic Zone at 33° southern latitude.

The three adjacent volcanic centres of Monte Pissis, Cerro Bonete Grande, and Cerro Bonete Chico are also considered part of this volcanic complex and are among the highest on Earth. These centres surround the ignimbrite and lava domes. The pumice-containing Incapillo ignimbrite forms the bulk of the caldera walls.

Around the caldera lie 40 lava domes, distributed in a northwest-southeast pattern. There is an eastern group between Monte Pissis and Cerro Bonete Chico and a western one on the Sierra de Veladero. Domes on the caldera's northern side are dacitic and show signs of alteration. Some domes are probably part of the pre-caldera volcanic complex, and several rhyodacitic domes were eroded after caldera formation; these were formerly considered erosional remnants. Older domes have reddish oxidized colours in satellite images.

Next to a heavily altered lava dome in the centre of the caldera lies the Laguna Corona del Inca. The lake has probably generated the evaporite and lacustrine deposits that lie on the caldera floor. Water temperatures of  obtained by satellite measurements suggest that hydrothermal activity persists in the lake. The lake is fed by meltwater; its surface area declined between 1986 and 2017.

Geology 

Incapillo is one of at least six different ignimbrite or caldera volcanoes that are part of the Central Volcanic Zone, in Chile, Bolivia and Argentina. The Central Volcanic Zone is one of four different volcanic arcs in the Andes. South of Incapillo, the Pampean flat slab region is associated with tectonic deformation and lack of volcanic activity until Tupungatito volcano farther south.

S. L. de Silva and P. Francis suggested in their 1991 book Volcanoes of the Central Andes that the Central Volcanic Zone should be subdivided into two systems of volcanoes, one in Peru and another in Chile, on the basis of the orientation (northwestsoutheast versus northsouth). C.A. Wood, G. McLaughlin and P. Francis in a 1987 paper at the American Geophysical Union suggested instead a subdivision into nine different groups.

Local 

Several studies by Suzanne Mahlburg Kay and others indicate that trends in the isotope ratios of Incapillo's volcanic rocks are because of a thickening crust and increased contribution thereof to the magmas. At the latitude of Incapillo, the northern Antofalla terrane borders the Cuyania terrane, both of which were attached to South America during the Ordovician but are of different provenance.

At the latitude of Incapillo, the Nazca plate subducting beneath the South America plate abruptly shallows towards the south. This shallowing forms the limit between the volcanically active Central Volcanic Zone and the magmatically inactive Pampean flat slab region farther south. This magmatic inactivity occurs because the flat slab removes the asthenospheric wedge.

Incapillo is part of a volcanic system active between 3.5 and 2mya that includes Ojos del Salado and Nevado Tres Cruces. It was the last volcanic centre formed in the region; subsequently, the shallowing of the subducting slab prevented volcanism east and south of it. Another volcanic trend considers Incapillo as part of a northeastsouthwest trend with Cerro Galan and Cerro Blanco. This trend may be related to delamination of the lower crust. Also, these centres are located between two domains of different rigidity, an Ordovician sedimentary domain of low rigidity and a higher rigidity basement.

The formation of the older lava domes may have been influenced by buried faults or the supply systems of the older Pissis and Bonete Chico volcanoes. A focus of seismic activity is found at Incapillo and a weak seismic velocity anomaly beneath the principal mountain range may be linked to its waning activity.

Composition 

Typical pumice contains crystals of biotite, hornblende, plagioclase, quartz, and sanidine, with minor amounts of apatite, iron oxides, and titanite. The lava domes have uniform crystalline compositions that are richer in magnesium than the ignimbrite. Within the lava dome rocks lie phenocrysts of amphibole, biotite, plagioclase, quartz, and titanite with some alkali feldspar in some domes. Older domes have higher amphibole and lower quartz content than younger domes. Post-caldera domes are strongly hydrothermally altered.

Rocks from Incapillo are rich in sodium and have high ratios of lanthanum and samarium to ytterbium and high ratios of barium to lanthanum, as well as high lead-206 to lead-204 and strontium-87/strontium-86 ratios. These rare-earth element patterns are similar to the Late Miocene Maricunga Belt rocks and contrast to early Miocene rocks. The changes occurred at the same time as the arc migrated eastward, terminating activity in the Maricunga Belt. The element ratios are pronouncedly arc-like with some adakitic signatures. The rocks contain considerably more sodium and alumina than almost all Central Andes siliceous volcanic rocks.

The composition of the lava domes suggests that they were formed by degassed magma left behind by the caldera-forming eruption. The pre-caldera lava domes were generated either directly from a common magma chamber or indirectly through secondary chambers. The lead isotope ratios are consistent with the volcano having formed at the edge of an area of granite and rhyolite of Paleozoic age. Incapillo magmas probably formed as adakitic high-pressure mafic magmas derived from the crust, either directly by anatexis or indirectly by dragged-down crustal fragments. The magmas are then modified by crustal contamination and fractional crystallization. As the subducting slab shallowed, crustal garnet-containing lherzolite and granulite-eclogite, contributed both from the crustal basis and forearc rocks that were dragged down by the subducting slab, became an increasingly important component of erupted magmas. Eventually, the Incapillo magma chamber was disconnected from the mantle and lower crust.

The Incapillo ignimbrite contains xenoliths with sizes of  formed by amphibolite. Amphibole crystals are enclosed in intersitital plagioclase crystals and sometimes contain secondary biotite crystals. Amphibole is the dominant component. Raw sulfur deposits occur on the volcano.

Climate, hydrology and vegetation 

Incapillo as a high altitude location has an alpine climate, with low temperatures and low oxygen, high winds and predominantly summer precipitation. The Desaguadero River originates on Bonete.

Vegetation varies depending on the water supply and altitude of the site, with an upper altitude limit of  beneath of which the vegetation takes the form of a scrub steppe. Grasses at  include Festuca, Stipa and in wetter areas also genera like Calamagrostis. Scrub like Adesmia and Nototriche copon occasionally form dense scrub patches.

History 

Activity at Incapillo commenced shortly after the end of the Maricunga Belt volcanism and occurred first at Monte Pissis between 6.5 and 3.5mya. Later volcanism occurred south of Incapillo 4.7±0.5mya, at Sierra de Veladero 5.6±1–3.6±0.5mya, and in the region of Cerro Bonete Chico 5.2±0.6–3.5±0.1mya. Some of the 32mya Pircas Negras mafic andesites appear to be associated with the Incapillo volcanic complex. These rocks form the last pulse of the Pircas Negras volcanism. Specific ages of the Pircas Negras flows in the Incapillo region include 4.7±0.5mya, 3.2±0.3mya and 1.9±0.2mya. Later, andesitic-rhyolitic volcanism formed ignimbrites and lava domes 2.9±0.4–1.1±0.4mya, with the youngest pre-caldera dome being 0.873±0.077mya old. The lava domes formed through non-explosive extrusion.

The ignimbrite appears in an eastward-heading ephemeral river valley and the southern Quebrada del Veladero, possibly also next to the Rio Salado headwaters. The ignimbrite displays banding features away from the caldera and in Quebrada de Veladero football-sized clasts are mixed within fine ash. Rocks from the ignimbrites farther away from their source indicate the ignimbrite probably formed from the mixing of less viscous dacitic magma with rhyolite. Ages have been found of 0.52 ± 0.03 and 0.51 ± 0.04mya ago. It is a rhyodacitic to rhyolitic ignimbrite with a high crystal and pumice and low lithic content. The volume of the Incapillo ignimbrite is comparable to that of the Katmai ignimbrite. The ignimbrite was probably formed from a low-height fountaining eruption without a high eruption column, forming a base surge first and pyroclastic flows later. The change from lava dome to ignimbrite-forming eruptions may have been triggered by the injection of hotter magmas into the magma chamber or less likely by changes in the tectonic context. During the eruption, a piston-like collapse formed the caldera.

Later, a debris flow named Veladero (also known as Quebrada de Veladero Ignimbrite) occurred in a glacier valley south of the caldera. It is rich in lithics and pumice. These lithics are derived from Sierra de Veladero, Cerro Bonete Chico, and Pircas Negras lavas. The debris flow does have a different composition from the main Incapillo ignimbrite, as it contains red-brown dacite and clasts. It has a massive ungraded composition and is likely a lahar or debris flow deposit, probably influenced by glacial or crater lake water. Wind-driven effects have generated hummocky ridges.

There are no dates available for post-caldera lava domes, which probably arose from magma ascending through the caldera forming conduits, seeing as these domes are found only inside the caldera. The elevated temperatures of the caldera lake suggest that hydrothermal activity still occurs beneath Incapillo. Seismic tomography has identified the presence of an at least partially molten structure beneath the volcano.

References

Sources 

 
 
 
 
 
 
 
 

Volcanoes of La Rioja Province, Argentina
Calderas of Argentina
Subduction volcanoes
Pleistocene calderas